State elections were held in South Australia on 30 May 1970. All 47 seats in the South Australian House of Assembly were up for election. The incumbent Liberal and Country League led by Premier of South Australia Steele Hall was defeated by the Australian Labor Party led by Leader of the Opposition Don Dunstan.

Background
The LCL had formed the government of South Australia for 35 of the previous 38 years due to a malapportionment favouring country areas over the Adelaide area.  Deliberately inequitable electoral boundaries resulted in a country vote being worth twice a vote in Adelaide, even though Adelaide accounted for two-thirds of the state's population.  This system was popularly known as the "Playmander," since it allowed Thomas Playford to remain Premier of South Australia for 26 years.  In the latter part of Playford's tenure, the LCL could only hope to win a few seats in Adelaide.  However, the LCL's grip on the country areas was such that it was able to retain power when it lost by substantial margins in terms of raw votes.

Labor finally overcame the Playmander at the 1965 election under Frank Walsh, but the malapportionment was strong enough that Labor only won 21 seats—just enough for a majority—despite taking 54.3 percent of the two-party vote. At the 1968 election, Labor, now led by Don Dunstan won 53.2 percent of the two-party vote. However, Labor lost two seats to the LCL under Playford's successor, Hall. With the LCL one seat short of a majority, the balance of power rested with long-serving independent Tom Stott, a good friend of former Premier Playford and no friend of Labor.  As expected, Stott announced his support for the LCL, thus making Hall the new Premier. If just 21 LCL votes were Labor votes in the seat of Murray, Labor would have formed majority government.

Hall was embarrassed that his party was in a position to win power despite finishing seven points behind Labor on the two-party vote. Concerned by the level of publicity and public protest about the issue, Hall was committed to the principle of a fairer electoral system.  He enacted a system that expanded the House of Assembly to 47 seats—28 of which were located in Adelaide, an increase of 15 metropolitan seats, more than double. The reforms fell short of "one vote one value," as Labor had demanded, since country areas were still somewhat over-represented, with the most populous metropolitan seats still containing double the number of voters than the least populous rural seats. However, while there was still rural overweighting, Adelaide now elected a majority of the legislature, making it a near-certainty that Labor would win the next election. Conventional wisdom was that Hall was effectively handing the premiership to Dunstan at the next election.

A 1968 Millicent by-election was triggered by the Court of Disputed Returns where Labor had won the seat by a single vote at the 1968 election. Labor increased their margin. Notably, turnout increased at the by-election.

In early 1970, Hall and Stott fell out over the location of a dam.  Stott wanted the dam built in his electorate while Hall thought it more use to locate it elsewhere.  Constituent anger forced Stott to vote against the Hall government, leading to an early election and the expected loss to Labor. Stott did not contest the 1970 election.

Hall remained Leader of the Opposition for two years before resigning from the LCL, claiming that the Party had 'lost its idealism [and] forgotten...its purpose for existence'. He founded the Liberal Movement, a progressive Liberal party that included about 200 former LCL members.  Hall won a Federal Senate seat for the Liberal Movement in 1974 (and was re-elected in 1975), serving in the Senate for three years before resigning his position.  His replacement as the Liberal Movement Senator for South Australia was Janine Haines, who would subsequently become the initial Australian Democrats Senator.

A 1971 Adelaide by-election was triggered as a result of the death of the incumbent MP. Labor easily retained the seat.

Key dates

Results

|}

Post-election pendulum

Legislative Council results
There was no upper house vote at this election, so the numbers in the Council remained as before.

See also
Results of the South Australian state election, 1970 (House of Assembly)
Candidates of the 1970 South Australian state election
Members of the South Australian House of Assembly, 1970-1973
Members of the South Australian Legislative Council, 1970-1973

References
History of South Australian elections 1857-2006, volume 1: ECSA
Historical lower house results
Historical upper house results

Specific

Elections in South Australia
1970 elections in Australia
1970s in South Australia
May 1970 events in Australia